Survivor: Borneo, originally known simply as Survivor or Survivor: Pulau Tiga, is the first season of the American CBS competitive reality television series Survivor. The show was filmed from March 13 through April 20, 2000, and premiered on May 31, 2000. The season started with 16 participants tasked with being left to survive in a remote area in Borneo, Malaysia, with minimal tools and supplies. Hosted by Jeff Probst, it consisted of 39 days with consecutive participants being removed by a majority vote.

The contestants were initially separated into two tribes, Tagi and Pagong, which represented the names of the beaches they were on. When 10 players remained, the contestants merged into one tribe, Rattana. While Tagi and Pagong's names and makeups were picked by the producers, Rattana was named by contestants Sean Kenniff and Jenna Lewis, because of the rattan wood that was at their camp. The series was won by Richard Hatch defeating Kelly Wiglesworth in a 4–3 jury vote.

The finale of the season had an average of 51.7 million viewers, the highest of the franchise. Nielsen reported that 125 million people watched at least some part of the finale. In 2006, Hatch was sentenced to 51 months in prison after failing to declare his $1,000,000 winnings.

Overview
Survivor is a reality television show based on the Swedish show Expedition Robinson created by Mark Burnett and Charlie Parsons. The series follows a number of participants being isolated in a remote location, where they must provide food, fire, and shelter for themselves. Every three days, one participant is removed from the series by majority vote, with challenges being held to give a reward (ranging from living and food related prizes to a car) and immunity from being voted out from the series. The last remaining player is awarded a prize of $1,000,000.

Production
Over 6,000 people applied for the show; 800 were then interviewed in 16 cities. Forty-eight people were then chosen, and after background checks and psychological evaluations done by the producers, the final 16 contestants and two alternates were picked. As the participants awaited the game's start, crews prepared the island for reward and immunity challenges, removing harmful items, checking for harmful animals in specific locations, and building a set. Camera and other crews were sent to the island three weeks in advance for testing. On the opposite side of the island from the tribes, headquarters were set up for the producers and crew to live in. This facility included traditional trailers with running water, televisions, and a phone line. The set used for the Tribal Council was built 200 yards from the crew's facility.

On March 7, 2000, the contestants were flown to Los Angeles, then to the city of Kota Kinabalu in Malaysian Borneo. From there they were taken by boat to their island. Contestants were not allowed to speak to one another until they got on the boat headed toward their beaches. They were surrounded by wildlife such as pythons, kraits, adders, monkeys, monitor lizards, and white-bellied sea eagles. Filming began on March 13, 2000, and lasted until April 20, 2000. This was the only season to have the winner revealed on location at the Final Tribal Council until the show's 41st season in 2021.

Contestants

There were 16 contestants, divided into two tribes, Pagong and Tagi. After six contestants were eliminated, the tribes were merged to form one tribe, Rattana. The final seven eliminated contestants made up the jury that decided who would be the winner. Below is a list of the participants of the series.

Future appearances
Rudy Boesch, Richard Hatch, Susan Hawk, and Jenna Lewis returned to Survivor for Survivor: All-Stars. Gervase Peterson returned for Survivor: Blood vs. Water alongside his niece, Marissa. Kelly Wiglesworth returned for Survivor: Cambodia. Outside of Survivor, the Borneo cast have made many appearances on other TV programs and film. Richard Hatch, Susan Hawk, Sean Kenniff, Ramona Gray, Gretchen Cordy, and Joel Klug all competed on a special edition of NBC's The Weakest Link. Susan Hawk and Gervase Peterson made an appearance on Big Brother 2. Colleen Haskell appeared in a lead role in 2001 film The Animal opposite actor Rob Schneider. Hatch competed in the 11th season of The Apprentice (known as the fourth season of The Celebrity Apprentice) and appeared on the 17th season of The Biggest Loser.

Season summary
The contestants were divided into two tribes of eight: Tagi and Pagong. The tribes fared equally in challenges but differed in organizational structure. Pagong was dominated by the younger, more carefree members, whereas four Tagi members—Kelly, Richard, Rudy, and Susan—formed an alliance, choosing to vote as a bloc to ensure their safety. When ten players remained—five from each tribe—the tribes merged into one, Rattana. The alliance strategy proved successful, and the four took advantage of the other contestants' lack of voting strategy. There was dissension in the alliance as Kelly was deemed untrustworthy, but she won four consecutive immunity challenges and was ineligible for elimination.

When only the four alliance members remained, the vote initially ended in a draw; close allies Richard and Rudy voted for Susan, and Susan and Kelly voted for Richard. On the revote, Kelly decided to switch her vote and Susan was eliminated. After winning the final immunity challenge, Kelly decided to eliminate Rudy because she believed she had a better chance against Richard. At the final Tribal Council, Susan lambasted Kelly for switching her vote and proclaimed her support for Richard. Richard's strategic prowess and leadership were valued over Kelly's challenge performances, and the jury awarded him the title of Sole Survivor by a vote of 4–3.

In the case of multiple tribes or castaways who win reward or immunity, they are listed in order of finish, or alphabetically where it was a team effort; where one castaway won and invited others, the invitees are in brackets.

Episodes

Voting history

Notes

Reception

Ratings

By the second week, the show had already gained over 18 million viewers, beating ABC's Who Wants to Be a Millionaire?'s ratings. After the season finale, Carter said that Survivor "built over a 13-week run to what was expected last night to be the biggest single television audience ever assembled for a summer television series, far eclipsed every expectation the network had when it acquired the rights to the show last year." Les Moonves, the president of CBS Television, said that "it has beaten our expectations by about double." 

The finale of Survivor was watched by 51.7 million viewers, the second-highest viewership of any American television episode during the first decade of the 21st century, exceeded only by the finale of Friends. The finale had higher ratings than the World Series, NBA finals, NCAA men's basketball finals, and Grammy Awards of that year. CBS was able to make the cost of commercial advertisers up to $600,000 during the season finale.

Survivor was the surprise summer hit show of the season garnering an average of 28.3 million viewers with a 12.1/36 share in the 18/49 market over its 13-week run. The season had the second-highest ranking and the second-highest average viewers of the entire series, behind The Australian Outback. In addition to the most finale viewers, it also had the most reunion viewers (37 million).

Critical reception
Survivor: Borneo initially received mixed reactions in the media. The New York Times Bill Carter wrote that Survivor has "clearly begun to emerge as part of the wider culture, with news and discussion about the show widespread on television and radio talk shows and coverage increasing in newspapers." On the Late Show with David Letterman, David Letterman began a segment titled "Top 10 Things That'll Get You Thrown Off the Survivor Island." During the first season, USA Today covered the show like a sporting event, listing which participant was voted off. USA Today also held a poll to see who viewers would have voted off. With 26 percent, Susan Hawk won the poll, although it had no effect on the game, as Susan made it to 4th place. CBS's The Early Show held an interview with each contestant the day after the episode in which they were voted off aired.

Survivor: Borneo was criticized by People for the Ethical Treatment of Animals (PETA) in response to footage showing the contestants trapping rats on the island, initially for fish bait but later for human consumption.

Susan Hawk's "snakes and rats" speech during the final Tribal Council has been cited as one of the greatest and most memorable speeches in the show's history.

Despite the initially mixed reception, Borneo has undergone significant critical reappraisal and is now considered one of the best seasons of the series. Jeff Probst consistently ranks it as his favorite, equating it to a "first girlfriend." Entertainment Weekly columnist Dalton Ross ranks Borneo tied for first with Survivor: Micronesia, saying "Borneo now seems dated and tame by comparison, but it's the biggest game changer in the past 20 years of television...If you ask me which is the most important season, well, obviously it's Borneo." Borneo is also ranked the best season by Examiner.com and Zap2it, and second behind Survivor: Heroes vs. Villains by The Wire. 

"Survivor Oz" has consistently ranked Borneo in the top 10 in every one of its annual polls ranking all seasons of the series; it was 5th in 2012, 6th in 2013, and 8th in 2014. "The Purple Rock Podcast" ranked Borneo the 15th best season in 2020. Fifteen years later, in the CBS Watch official issue commemorating the 15th anniversary and 30th season of Survivor, Borneo was ranked the seventh-greatest season of the series by a viewer poll. In another poll in the same magazine, Richard Hatch's win at the end of the season was voted by viewers as the #5 most memorable moment in the series. In 2015, a poll by Rob Has a Podcast ranked Borneo 7th out of 30 with Rob Cesternino ranking this season 5th. This was updated in 2021 during Cesternino's podcast, Survivor All-Time Top 40 Rankings, ranking 13th out of 40. In 2020, Inside Survivor ranked this season 4th out of 40 saying that "Borneo is a season rich in character, providing a fascinating view into society and human relationships within the context of a part-survival/part-strategy game-show."

Noel Murray of The A.V. Club noted that the 5th episode, "Pulling Your Own Weight", was one of the season's most influential segments. In this episode, the Tagi alliance led by Hatch secretly worked together to vote Dirk Been off the island, surprising many of the remaining contestants, who were shocked to discover the alliance. Murray noted that while this sentiment towards alliances at the time seemed controversial and against the spirit of the show, it formed the basis for most future Survivor series and reality television in general, and highlighted the lengths to which players on reality television shows would go to win the game.

DVD release
The DVD release of season one was released by CBS Home Entertainment in the U.S. on May 11, 2004, after it had completed broadcast on television. As well as every episode from the season, the DVD release features bonus material including commentary, interviews and behind-the-scenes featurettes.

Controversy
In early 2001, Borneo contestant Stacey Stillman sued CBS, claiming that executive producer Mark Burnett arranged her exit and orchestrated the show's outcome. Her 14-page lawsuit alleged that two of her fellow tribemates, Dirk Been and Sean Kenniff, were persuaded to change their vote from 72-year-old Rudy Boesch to her. Stillman sought restitution for lost prize money, plus $75,000 representing out-of-pocket expenses and punitive damages. While CBS and Burnett denied the allegations, Been supported them; Kenniff admitted talking to Burnett, but told USA Today that the vote wasn't influenced and Burnett said only to "vote your conscience." Burnett counter-sued Stillman for at least $5,000,000. Eventually the case was settled out of court.

References
General

 
 

Specific

External links
 Official Survivor: Borneo Website
 
 Survivor: Borneo at IMDb

01
2000 American television seasons
2000 in Malaysia
Sabah
Television shows set in Malaysia
Television shows filmed in Malaysia